Alfred Ernest Stearns (June 6, 1871 - November 15, 1949) was an American educator and 9th Principal of Phillips Academy in Andover, Massachusetts from 1903 to 1933.  He was featured on the cover of Time for its 8 Feb 1926 edition.

Notes

References

Bibliography

External links
 Phillips Academy official website
 

American educators
1871 births
1949 deaths
Heads of Phillips Academy Andover
People from Orange, New Jersey
Phillips Academy alumni